The Comoro friar (Amauris comorana) is a species of nymphalid butterfly in the Danainae subfamily. It is endemic to the Comoros, where it is only found on the island of Grand Comore.

References

Sources

External links
Seitz, A. Die Gross-Schmetterlinge der Erde 13: Die Afrikanischen Tagfalter. Plate XIII 25

Amauris
Lepidoptera of the Comoros
Endemic fauna of the Comoros
Butterflies described in 1897
Taxa named by Charles Oberthür
Taxonomy articles created by Polbot